Nexø Parish is a parish in the Diocese of Copenhagen in Bornholm Municipality, Denmark. The parish contains the town of Nexø.

References 

Bornholm
Parishes of Denmark